INSEAD, a contraction of "Institut Européen d'Administration des Affaires" is a non-profit graduate-only business school that maintains campuses in Europe (Fontainebleau, France), Asia (Singapore), the Middle East (Abu Dhabi, United Arab Emirates), and North America (San Francisco). INSEAD offers a full-time Master of Business Administration, an executive MBA (EMBA), a Master of Finance, a PhD in management, a Master in Management, Business Foundations Post-Graduate degrees, and a variety of executive education programs.

Its MBA program, which is taught in English, is consistently ranked among the best in the world. The MBA has produced the second-most CEOs of the world’s 500 largest companies behind Harvard Business School and the sixth most billionaires.  

Despite its relatively small size as a specialist, graduate-only university, INSEAD educated the second-most C-suite executives of listed companies in the world's 19 biggest economies, behind Harvard University. INSEAD is among the top 20 universities globally that produced the most of the world's ultra high-net-worth individuals.  

The school has a strong reputation for entrepreneurship. In 2021, INSEAD was ranked fourth globally in PitchBook's ranking of MBA programs for founders and seventh for female founders. Approximately 700 alumni of the school founded more than 600 companies, which in total raised $23 billion. As of 2022, 15% of European unicorns were founded by an INSEAD alumnus, making the school the #1 unicorn producing university in the continent. As of 2022, Harvard University, Stanford University, and INSEAD are the only three universities ever to top Poets and Quants’s list of most-funded startup by MBA students.  Notable companies founded by INSEAD alumni include Admiral Group, Wise, Nubank, MongoDB, Asklepios Kliniken, L’Occitane, Gorillas, Blablacar, Tudou, Ecovadis and Business Insider.

The school also educated four heads of state/governments, a few heads of legislature, dozens of cabinet members, and dozens of members of legislatures of countries around the world. 

INSEAD admits no more than 12% of students of the same nationality and requires each student to speak two languages on entry and three languages by graduation.

History

INSEAD was founded in 1957 by venture capitalist Georges Doriot, Claude Janssen, and Olivier Giscard d'Estaing. Original seed money was provided by the Paris Chamber of Commerce. The school was originally based in the Château de Fontainebleau, before moving to its current Europe campus in 1967.

Georges Doriot, a professor at Harvard Business School and a General in US Army during World War II, wanted an institution that would introduce business education to Europe and bring European businessmen together post-war. In 1955, he presented his idea of creating a new school of management and business administration to the Paris Chamber of Commerce, whose presidents, Jean Marcou and Philippe Dennis, not only funded the venture but also became first presidents of the school. The welcoming ceremony of the first promotion for the Master of Business Administration at the Château de Fontainebleau was held on September 12, 1959. Almost 110 candidates had applied, 62 were admitted and 57 attended the first course. The official inauguration took place on October 9, 1959, at the Château de Fontainebleau 5.

INSEAD emphasizes international collaboration from day one. Therefore, the school imposes a quota on percentage of students with the same nationality. Proficiency in multiple languages is also considered a critical enabler for its objectives. Initial classes were taught in 3 languages: English, French and German, interchangeably. Until the 1990s, classes could still be taught in any of the 3 languages. As of now, all classes are taught in English, but the school still requires students to know any 3 languages for graduation.

In 2000, the school opened another campus in Singapore. In 2012, INSEAD became a founding member of the Sorbonne University Alliance, moving toward a merger with leading specialist institutions in other fields to create a top-tier multidisciplinary university.

History
1957: INSEAD founded
1959: First MBA intake in Fontainebleau and first business school to offer a one-year MBA program 
1967: Opening of the school's first campus on the edge of the Forest of Fontainebleau (now called the 'Europe Campus')
1968: First Executive Education programme
1976: Launch of the INSEAD Alumni Fund
1989: Launch of the PhD programme
1995: Launch of the first INSEAD Development Campaign, which raised funds for permanently endowed chairs and research
2000: First business school with full campuses on multiple continents, with the Asia Campus opening in Singapore
2001: Announcement of the INSEAD-Wharton Alliance and first MBA participant exchanges
2003: Launch of the Executive MBA programme
2007: INSEAD Centre opened in Abu Dhabi, primarily for research and executive education; launch of a dual degree Executive MBA with Tsinghua University in China
2013: MBA participant exchange agreement with CEIBS launched
2015: Inauguration of the Leadership Development Center in Singapore
2016: First and only business school to achieve a ‘triple first’ in rankings – MBA, Executive MBA (Tsinghua-INSEAD EMBA) and Single School Executive MBA (INSEAD GEMBA) in the Financial Times 2016 rankings
2018: Launch of the Hoffmann Global Institute for Business and Society
2020: Opening of the INSEAD San Francisco Hub for Business Innovation and launch of the Master in Management Programme
2021: Financial Times ranks INSEAD MBA #1 in the world, for the third time in 6 years

Campuses

The original campus (the INSEAD Europe Campus) is located in Fontainebleau, near Paris, France. INSEAD's second campus (the INSEAD Asia Campus) is in the one-north district of the city-state of Singapore next to one-north MRT station. The third campus (the INSEAD Middle East Campus) is located in Abu Dhabi. INSEAD expanded its presence to North America in 2020 with the opening of the INSEAD San Francisco Hub for Business Innovation. INSEAD follows the US model of a business school. INSEAD has been a pioneer in setting up a multi-campus business school as a way to increase the global presence and nature of its faculty and curriculum and to reflect the global diversity of its international student and participant population. A Harvard Business School case study, for instance, explores its approach to business education in a global context and how it functions with a multi-campus setting.

Grande École System 

INSEAD is a Grande école, a French institution of higher education that is separate from, but parallel and connected to the main framework of the French public university system. Similar to the Ivy League in the United States, Oxbridge in the UK, and the C9 League in China, Grandes Écoles are elite academic institutions that admit students through an extremely competitive process. Alums go on to occupy elite positions within government, administration, and corporate firms in France.

Although they are more expensive than public universities in France, Grandes Écoles typically have much smaller class sizes and student bodies, and many of their programs are taught in English. International internships, study abroad opportunities, and close ties with government and the corporate world are a hallmark of the Grandes Écoles. Many of the top-ranked business schools in Europe are members of the Conférence des Grandes Écoles (CGE), as is INSEAD, and out of the 250 business schools in France, only 39 are CGE members. In addition to the French Ministry of Education, INSEAD is further accredited by the elite international business school accrediting organizations and it holds the much coveted Triple accreditation: The European Foundation for Management Development (EQUIS), The Association to Advance Collegiate Schools of Business (AACSB), and Association of MBAs (AMBA)

Degree programmes

Master in Management (MIM) 
This 14 to 16-month program has an innovative learning approach with an applied problem-solving orientation. It aims to empower the next generation of well-rounded, agile-thinking and innovative individuals who are ready to make a positive impact in today's society. The Masters in Management program is targeted to younger individuals with 0–2 years of experience and consists of coursework in both the Fontainebleau and Singapore campuses, with optional field trips to China, Abu Dhabi, and San Francisco. The program ranked 4th in the 2022 QS Business Masters Rankings for Management.

MBA programme

INSEAD's MBA participants can take the MBA's core courses at either  or both of its Europe and Asia campuses (as well as an MBA period at its Middle East campus). They follow the same core courses in parallel regardless of   campus, and there are faculty who teach on both the Europe and Asia campuses as well as permanent faculty at each of the three campuses who live and work in the respective regions. Approximately 20% of the class entered the MBA program with other graduate or professional degrees; including medical doctors, lawyers, and Ph.Ds.

INSEAD offers two MBA schedules per year: one starting in September which takes ten months to complete, and a 12-month promotion starting in January for students who want  to complete a summer internship.

The INSEAD MBA curriculum comprises required core courses and electives. The core covers traditional management disciplines including finance, economics, organizational behavior, accounting, ethics, marketing, statistics, operations management, international political environment, public policy, supply chain management, leadership and corporate strategy. There are 75 electives on offer in areas such as accounting and control, decision sciences, economics and political science, entrepreneurship and family enterprise, finance, and organisational behavior, strategy, marketing, technology and operations management. Students are required  to speak two languages upon entry and a third by graduation.

Executive MBA programme

INSEAD has two EMBA Executive MBA programmes. The Global Executive MBA (GEMBA), and the Tsinghua INSEAD EMBA (TIEMBA). Both EMBA programmes are master's-level degree programmes that take place on a part-time, modular basis.

The programmes offer experienced business executives an intensive 14–17-month modular course that takes place in modular periods (approximately every six to seven weeks). Each period on campus is between one and two weeks' duration. For the GEMBA programme the physical time on campus represents 12 weeks in total with participants going to all three campuses (Fontainebleau, France, Abu Dhabi, and Singapore). For the TIEMBA programme the physical time on campus represents 12 weeks in total with participants alternating between Tsinghua's campus in Beijing, China, and INSEAD's campus in Singapore.

Both the GEMBA and TIEMBA programmes include a schedule of group coaching, 360-degree assessments and team activities designed to develop a leadership style, called the Leadership Development Programme.

Executive Master in Change (EMC)

The Executive Master in Change is a specialized master's degree. It provides a grounding in basic drivers of human behavior and the hidden dynamics of organizations. Integrating business education with a range of psychological disciplines, the programme enables participants to understand themselves and others at a fundamental level, which prepares them to assume  roles in leadership, individual and organizational development and change management.

Master in Finance

INSEAD's Master in Finance (MFin) teaches participants finance and accounting skills on a par with those taught in an MBA programme, and also offers leadership and management perspectives. The program   is offered in a modular format over a 20-month period to allow professionals to study while continuing to work. Participants take time off from work for each of the six modules (2–3 weeks each) to take classes on campus, and continue working in between.

PhD programme

The INSEAD PhD in Management is a doctoral degree in business to prepare students for a career in academia. It requires four to five years of full-time study – the first two years devoted to coursework, while from the third and fourth (or sometimes fifth) years  dedicated to research and dissertation. Students have the option to start their studies on either the Asia (Singapore) or Europe (France) campus, and do an exchange in North America (USA) through the INSEAD-Wharton Alliance. There are eight areas of specialization: Accounting, Decision Sciences, Entrepreneurship, Finance, Marketing, Organisational Behavior, Strategy, and Technology and Operations Management. INSEAD offers fellowships, whereby students receive full tuition fee waiver, annual stipend and research support funding.

Business Foundations Programme

INSEAD in collaboration with Sorbonne Université offers the Dual Degree: Business Foundations (BFC) programme which is one of INSEAD's most selective degrees. "BFC" is tailored for recent master or PhD graduates from the sciences, medicine, humanities, engineering and law. The programme equips participants with a broad set of business and economics skills that optimally complement their graduate training. It also supports participants' transition to a business career and helps aspiring entrepreneurs to fulfil the goal of their own start-up by complementing their ideas with a foundation in business and leadership. Both Universities offer fellowships to selected students.

Executive Education

INSEAD holds both company/firm specific and open enrolment executive education programmes at its locations in Europe, Asia, the Middle East and North America, as well as in partnership with corporate universities. The school offers programmes in-person, online, and virtually. Participants usually come from senior or top management, with many years of experience within their company or industry and younger 'high-potentials' identified as being key in succession strategies within their companies. Approximately 12,000 executives of around 130 nationalities undertake courses or programmes at INSEAD each year.

Since the establishment of its executive education programmes in 1967, 195,000 participants have undertaken a programme at INSEAD.

In 2011, INSEAD launched an Executive Certificate in Global Management which is a formal recognition awarded to participants who complete at least three INSEAD global management and leadership programmes within a four-year period.

Open Programmes 
INSEAD executive education Open Programmes, include more than 60 offerings, covering all business disciplines as well as specific industries and world regions.

Customised Programmes 
For more than 50 years, INSEAD has designed Customised Programmes for some of the world’s largest and most respected companies. Expert faculty partner with organisations to design programmes that develop specific skills to meet targeted objectives.

Certificates 
INSEAD offers six certificates: the Certificate in Global Management, the Certificate in Negotiation, two Certificates in Corporate Governance, the INSEAD Online Certificate: Leading in a Transforming World and the new INSEAD LEAD Certificate.

Rankings

INSEAD's MBA program ranked 1st in 2021, 2017 and 2016 in the Financial Times Global MBA Ranking. The dual degree Executive MBA with Tsinghua University is consistently ranked in the top 10 by the Financial Times.

Partnerships and alliances

INSEAD is in alliance with:
 Sorbonne University (created in 2012 with INSEAD as a founding partner). As part of Sorbonne University Association, INSEAD collaborate with other institutions on research and academic activities. Most notably are:
 INSEAD-Sorbonne Behavior Lab
 INSEAD-Sorbonne Business Foundation Certificate
 INSEAD-Sorbonne Dual PhD Degree
 INSEAD and Paris 2 Panthéon-Assas University Joint LLM in International Business 
Wharton School of the University of Pennsylvania (alliance – launched in 2001)

INSEAD has exchange programmes with:
Wharton School of the University of Pennsylvania (for MBA, Executive MBA and PhD programmes)
Kellogg School of Management (for MBA programme)
CEIBS (for Executive Education and MBA programmes)

INSEAD has degrees partnership with:
 PhD Dual Degree between INSEAD and Sorbonne University
 LLM in International Business - Collaborated between INSEAD and Paris 2 Panthéon-Assas University
 MIT Sloan School of Management – INSEAD graduates can have 1-year Masters of Sciences in Management Studies degree from MIT.
Paul H. Nitze School of Advanced International Studies at Johns Hopkins University in Washington, D.C. (dual-degree MA and MBA program – launched in 2011)
Tsinghua University (dual Executive MBA programme – launched in 2006)
Art Center College of Design (launched in 2015)
Teachers College, Columbia University (launched in 2014)

Research

Centres of excellence

INSEAD has research centres conducting research in different business and geographical areas.

Case studies

The case method is largely used in the classroom as a teaching method. Business case studies authored by INSEAD professors are the second most widely used in classrooms by business schools globally, after Harvard Business School's case studies.

The business cases that have been designed at INSEAD have received many awards, are made available in case clearing houses, and are used by many other business schools.

Business simulation games
Business simulation games are used by INSEAD. Many of them have been designed by INSEAD faculties, and used in many institutions, including:
 The EIS simulation (change management)
 FORAD (finance)
 INDUSTRAT (marketing)
 Markstrat (marketing)

Innovation in education
A lot of research and initiatives are conducted at INSEAD to incorporate innovative learning approaches.

Centers conduct research in learning technologies and approaches such as:
 INSEAD CALT (the Centre of Advanced Learning Technologies) has been involved in many research projects, and in particular projects funded by the research programmes from the European Commission on approaches such as business simulations, or learning communities.
 INSEAD Learning Innovation Centre was funded to managing innovation in INSEAD programme design and delivery. For instance, INSEAD Learning Innovation Centre has introduced the use of the Second Life virtual world as an education tool.
 INSEAD VR Immersive Learning Initiative is pioneering new approaches to learning and research for management and business. The Initiative uses immersive experiences to educate future business leaders. VR technology is also used in the annual Master Strategist day at INSEAD.

Alumni

The INSEAD alumni community consists of 65,222 individuals across 180 countries with 169 nationalities.

The INSEAD Alumni Association (IAA) was founded by alumni in 1961 and represents all INSEAD alumni.

See also 
 Blue Ocean Strategy – a book and strategy concept developed by INSEAD faculty
 Management science

References

External links
 
 
 Student and Alumni Reviews about INSEAD MBA Program

 
Business schools in France
Business schools in Singapore
Educational institutions established in 1957
Fontainebleau
1957 establishments in France